Juris Zarins (Zariņš) (born 1945, in Germany) is an American-Latvian archaeologist and professor at Missouri State University, who specializes in the Middle East.

Biography 
Zarins is ethnically Latvian, but was born in Germany at the end of the Second World War.  His parents emigrated to the United States soon after he was born.  He graduated from high school in Lincoln, Nebraska in 1963 and earned a B.A. in anthropology from the University of Nebraska in 1967.  He served in the U.S. Army in Vietnam before completing his Ph.D. in Ancient Near Eastern Languages and Archaeology at the University of Chicago in 1974.  He then served as archaeological adviser to the Department of Antiquities of the Kingdom of Saudi Arabia before coming to Missouri State in 1978.

Zarins joined an Expedition in search of the lost city of Ubar which started in 1992. The team was composed of NASA Scientists Ronald Blom and Charles Elachi, Film Maker and Archaeologist Nicholas Clapp and British Explorer Ranulph Fiennes. Together This team set out to find Ubar and ended up working on one site known as the Shisr site. While there, Clapp decided that what they had found was in fact Ubar, Zarins was not so easily convinced.
He discussed Ubar in a 1996 NOVA interview:

In 1996 a joint effort from Juris Zarins, George Hedges and Ronald Blom sprung the Creation of a website called The Archaeology Fund. This Website contains a vast collection of the teams findings in the Dhofar region as well as surrounding areas. It also contains information regarding ancient trade routes and their connection to long distance trade; satellite images of the region not on the archaeology Fund's website can be found with the NASA Jet Propulsion Laboratory (JPL).

Currently UNESCO recognizes the Shisr site as Wubar (Ubar) which can be found on the official UNESCO World Heritage Fund website.

In 2007, following further research and excavation, a paper partly authored by him narrowed the meaning of the name "Ubar". Rather than being a city, interpretation of the evidence suggested that "Ubar" was more likely to have been a region—the "Land of the Iobaritae" identified by Ptolemy. The decline of the region was probably due to several factors: frankincense trade diminished in importance because of the conversion of the Roman Empire to Christianity, which did not require incense in the same quantities for its rituals, the climatic changes led to desiccation of the area (desert ground-water levels continued to fall and the oases dried up), while sea transport became a more reliable way of carrying goods. Also, it became difficult to find local labour to collect the resin.

Zarins has published many articles on a number of topics concerning the archaeology of the Near East, which include the domestication of the horse, early pastoral nomadism, and the obsidian, indigo, and frankincense trades.  He received an Excellence in Research Award from Missouri State in 1988. He has proposed that the Semitic languages arose as a result of a circum-Arabian nomadic pastoral complex, which developed in the period of the desiccation of climates at the end of the pre-pottery phase in the Ancient Near East.

Zarins argued that the Garden of Eden was situated at the head of the Persian Gulf (present-day Kuwait), where the Tigris and Euphrates Rivers run into the sea, from his research on this area using information from many different sources, including LANDSAT images from space. In this theory, the Bible's Gihon River would correspond with the Karun River in Iran, and the Pishon River would correspond to the Wadi Batin river system that once drained the now dry, but once quite fertile central part of the Arabian Peninsula. His suggestion about the Pishon River is supported by James A. Sauer (1945–1999) formerly of the American Center of Oriental Research although strongly criticized by the archaeological community.

References

External links 
 
 

1945 births
Living people
20th-century American archaeologists
21st-century American archaeologists
American people of Latvian descent
German emigrants to the United States
Missouri State University faculty
University of Chicago alumni
University of Nebraska–Lincoln alumni
United States Army personnel of the Vietnam War
United States Army soldiers
Remote sensing archaeologists
Iram of the Pillars